The Spot is the second extended play and only remix EP by American hip hop group The Beatnuts. It was released on February 10, 1998 via Relativity/Epic Records. Recording sessions took place at Chung King Studios in New York. Produced by the Beatnuts, it is composed mainly of remixes: it also has three sequel songs and one new recording, "Treat$". The sequels features new vocals over the original beats while the remixes contains the original vocals set to new music. The source of its remixes are songs from prior Beatnuts albums Intoxicated Demons: The EP, The Beatnuts: Street Level and Stone Crazy. It features guest appearances from A.L., Nogoodus and Rawcoticks.

The EP peaked at number 52 on the Billboard Top R&B/Hip-Hop Albums in the United States.

Track listing

Charts

References

External links

1998 EPs
Remix EPs
Epic Records EPs
1998 remix albums
The Beatnuts albums
Relativity Records EPs
Epic Records remix albums
Albums produced by the Beatnuts
Relativity Records remix albums
Albums recorded at Chung King Studios